The Military ranks of South Korea are the military insignia used by the Republic of Korea Armed Forces. Due to the close military cooperation and the presence of the United States Forces Korea, South Korean ranks are inspired by the United States.

Current ranks

Commissioned officer ranks
The rank insignia of commissioned officers.

Warrant officer ranks
This rank falls in between non-commissioned and commissioned officers. The rank is denoted by a gold-colored  insignia and, in the case of the South Korean Navy, a single broken sleeve stripe.

Other ranks
The rank insignia of non-commissioned officers and enlisted personnel.

Historic ranks

Other ranks

See also
 Comparative military ranks of Korea
 Military ranks of North Korea

References

External links
 

Korea, South
Military ranks of South Korea